Dean Strauch (born 4 June 1966) is a former Australian rules footballer who played with Carlton in the Victorian Football League (VFL).

Notes

External links

1966 births
Carlton Football Club players
Golden Square Football Club players
Australian rules footballers from Victoria (Australia)
Living people